The GER Class R24 was a class of  steams designed by James Holden for the Great Eastern Railway (GER).  They passed to the London and North Eastern Railway at the grouping in 1923 and received the LNER classification J67.  Some R24s were rebuilt with higher boiler pressure in which form they were similar to the later Class S56.  The rebuilt R24s, together with the S56s, were classified J69 by the LNER.

History
These locomotives were very similar to the Class T18 locomotives, sharing the same dimensions for most major components. They were all built at the GER's Stratford Works between 1890 and 1901.

Eighty-nine locomotives were rebuilt between 1904 and 1921 with  boilers and increased water capacity. Most were fitted with air brakes and used in suburban and branch line passenger service alongside the Class S56. The 51 locomotives not rebuilt were used for shunting and working local goods trains.

Withdrawal
The first withdrawal was in 1931 due to accident damage. Eleven were withdrawn in 1937, and one in 1939. Thirteen class J69 locomotives were lent to the War Department in October 1939, of which eight had been built as Class R24. They were sold to the War Department in October 1940, where they were used on the Melbourne and Longmoor Military Railways. The remaining locomotives were renumbered 8490–8616 in order of construction (with one exception); however gaps were left where the locomotives sold to the War Department would have been. At nationalisation in 1948, they all passed to British Railways, who added 60000 to their number. Post-war withdrawals started in 1953, and by 1962 all had been retired.

References

 
 
 
 Ian Allan ABC of British Railways Locomotives, 1948 edition, part 4, pp 49–50

External links 

 LNER Encyclopedia

R24
0-6-0T locomotives
Railway locomotives introduced in 1890
War Department locomotives
Standard gauge steam locomotives of Great Britain
Freight locomotives